Sebastián Taborda Ramos (born 22 May 1981) is a Uruguayan former professional footballer who played as a centre forward.

Club career
Born in Montevideo, Taborda started playing professionally with Defensor Sporting, and went on to serve three loan stints in as many countries. In the summer 2005 he joined La Liga club Deportivo de La Coruña, with the Spaniards playing €2.9 million for his services.

At the Galicians, Taborda was only a third-string striker, also having to battle with a series of injuries. On 27 November 2008, he signed for Segunda División team Hércules CF, loaned until the end of the season, going on to appear in less than one third of the league matches as the Alicante side finished fourth.

On 1 September 2009, Taborda's contract with Depor expired and he returned to Defensor after a four-year absence. In July 2010, however, he changed teams again, joining Newell's Old Boys from the Argentine Primera División.

International career
Taborda received one full cap for Uruguay, which came on 4 February 2003 in a friendly match with Iran in Hong Kong. Additionally, he also represented the nation at under-20 and under-23 levels.

References

External links
 
 Argentine League statistics at Fútbol XXI  
 National team data 
 
 

1981 births
Living people
Footballers from Montevideo
Uruguayan footballers
Association football forwards
Uruguayan Primera División players
Defensor Sporting players
Centro Atlético Fénix players
Club Atlético River Plate (Montevideo) players
Club Nacional de Football players
Liga MX players
Club Universidad Nacional footballers
Chilean Primera División players
Club Deportivo Universidad Católica footballers
La Liga players
Segunda División players
Deportivo de La Coruña players
Hércules CF players
Argentine Primera División players
Newell's Old Boys footballers
Uruguay international footballers
Uruguayan expatriate footballers
Expatriate footballers in Mexico
Expatriate footballers in Chile
Expatriate footballers in Spain
Expatriate footballers in Argentina
Uruguayan expatriate sportspeople in Spain